Keeper of the Flame is a 1942 Metro-Goldwyn-Mayer (MGM) drama film directed by George Cukor, and starring Spencer Tracy and Katharine Hepburn.

The screenplay by Donald Ogden Stewart is adapted from the 1942 novel Keeper of the Flame by I. A. R. Wylie. Hepburn plays the widow of a famous civic leader who has died in an accident. Tracy portrays a former war correspondent who intends to write a flattering biography of the dead man, only to find that his death is shrouded in mystery. Screenwriter Stewart considered the script the finest moment of his career, feeling vindicated by the assignment as he believed that Hollywood had punished him for years for his political views. Principal filming began in the last week of August 1942, four months after the release of the novel, published by Random House. The picture was filmed on a sound stage, with no location shooting. Hepburn had already begun a relationship with Tracy, and his heavy drinking led her to become his vigilant guardian during the filming.

The film was screened for the Office of War Information's Bureau of Motion Pictures on December 2, 1942, where it was disapproved of by the Bureau's chief, Lowell Mellett. Keeper of the Flame premiered to a poor reception at Radio City Music Hall on Thursday, March 18, 1943. MGM head Louis B. Mayer stormed out of the cinema, enraged by his having encouraged the making of a film that equated wealth with fascism. Republican members of Congress complained about the film's leftist politics and demanded that Will H. Hays, president of the Motion Picture Production Code, establish motion picture industry guidelines for propaganda. Cukor was dissatisfied with the film and considered it one of his poorest efforts.

Plot
On a rainy night, national hero Robert Forrest drives his car over a small bridge that has collapsed. He is killed, and the entire United States goes into deep mourning. Admirer and renowned journalist Stephen O'Malley (Spencer Tracy) returns from Europe to write a biography of the great man. Among the throngs covering the funeral, he finds his old friends and fellow reporters Jane Harding (Audrey Christie) and Freddie Ridges (Stephen McNally). They remain after the rest of the press leave.

Forrest's widow, Christine (Katharine Hepburn), refuses to speak to reporters throughout the proceedings. However, O'Malley befriends youngster Jeb (Darryl Hickman), son of the gatekeeper of the Forrest estate, Jason Rickards (Howard Da Silva). The grief-stricken boy shows him a way into the mansion, where he meets Christine. Though she is cordial, she refuses to cooperate with his biography. After O'Malley leaves, Forrest's private secretary, Clive Kerndon (Richard Whorf), fearful of how the reporter will react to the brush-off, convinces Christine to offer her help to O'Malley so that they can guide him in the direction they want.

Over time, O'Malley gains the widow's trust. Christine is the "keeper of the flame," protecting her husband's memory and reputation. O'Malley's instincts tell him that a secret is being kept from him. He discovers that Forrest's elderly, mentally ill mother (Margaret Wycherly) is living in a separate house on the vast estate. Despite her servants' attempts to keep them apart, O'Malley manages to speak with her and obtains more clues from her ramblings.

O'Malley notices "the arsenal," an old fortification near the Forrest mansion that served as Robert Forrest's office and library. One afternoon, O'Malley observes smoke rising from the arsenal's chimney. When he asks Kerndon about the building's purpose, Kerndon (who cannot see the smoke) tells him it is only a storehouse. O'Malley slips away to investigate. He discovers Christine burning what she claims are love letters, but he suspects otherwise. Later, Kerndon telephones somebody and assures the unnamed party that he will take care of the situation. As O'Malley learns more, he finds evidence implicating Christine in her husband's death and begins to wonder if she and her cousin, Geoffrey Midford (Forrest Tucker), are lovers and murderers. However, Geoffrey's announcement of his engagement to Rickards' daughter, and Christine's reaction, discounts that theory.

When O'Malley admits he cares for Christine, she finally breaks down and reveals the ugly truth. Her husband had been corrupted by the adulation he received and plotted to use his enormous influence to turn Americans to fascist ideals to gain control of the United States. She shows O'Malley papers stored in the arsenal that reveal how Forrest (backed by secretive, ultra-wealthy, power-hungry individuals) planned to use racism, anti-union sentiment, and antisemitism to divide the country, turning social groups against one another in order to create the chaos that would let him seize power. Christine discovered the plot the day before her husband's death. She went riding the next morning and, coming upon the washed-out bridge, could have warned her husband, but decided that a "clean death in the rain was the best thing that could happen to Robert Forrest." O'Malley convinces her to help him write a book detailing Forrest's scheme.

Kerndon eavesdrops, then locks the arsenal's door, sets the building ablaze, and shoots into it through an embrasure. Christine, fatally injured, urges O'Malley to write his book. A man rushes to the burning building carrying an axe, but Kerndon comes up behind him and knocks him out by hitting the man in the head with a gun. Then an automobile driven by Midford rushes to the scene and Kerndon stands in the middle of the road and shoots at the passengers, he is run down and killed. Midford leaves the car picks up the axe, rushes to the building, breaks through the door, and they rescue O'Malley.

O'Malley ultimately writes a book titled Christine Forrest: Her Life, which exposes the plot.

Cast

 Spencer Tracy as Steven O'Malley
 Katharine Hepburn as Christine Forrest
 Richard Whorf as Clive Kerndon
 Margaret Wycherly as Mrs. Forrest
 Forrest Tucker as Geoffrey Midford
 Frank Craven as Doctor Fielding, one of the few critical of Forrest
 Stephen McNally as Freddie Ridges (billed as "Horace McNally")
 Percy Kilbride as Orion Peabody, O'Malley's taxi driver
 Audrey Christie as Jane Harding
 Darryl Hickman as Jeb Rickards
 Donald Meek as Mr. Arbuthnot
 Howard Da Silva as Jason Rickards
 William Newell as Piggot

Production

Script and casting

The script was based on an unpublished book by I. A. R. Wylie. RKO Pictures bought the book in outline form in April 1941 but encountered casting difficulties and sold the rights to MGM in December 1941 for $50,000. A day or two after they had obtained the rights, MGM Vice-President Eddie Mannix realized the source material was political in nature and tried to abandon the project. However, following the attack on Pearl Harbor, Mannix relented and the production went forward. Once the film went into production at MGM, the book was published by Random House in April 1942.

MGM studio head Louis B. Mayer assigned the script to Donald Ogden Stewart—one of his favorite screenwriters. Mayer's choice seemed unusual, because up to that time Stewart had written only light romantic comedies featuring wealthy East Coast socialites, but Mayer felt Stewart's strongly leftist political leanings would enable him to chalk out a better screenplay.

Stewart approached the project with gusto, remarking that he "wrote an adaptation from a novel that tells about the fascist mice who are nibbling away at our country while we're busy fighting a good war." Stewart believed Hollywood had punished him for years for his political views and felt vindicated by the assignment, declaring that "here was my compensation for the sabotage of my radical attempt to do my bit ...". The script was the proudest moment of his entire career. Stewart, however, had extensive problems adapting the novel for the screen, and filming—originally due to begin in June 1942—was delayed for several months while he worked on the screenplay. He consulted with the Bureau of Motion Pictures in the U.S. Office of War Information, an agency of the federal government created in June 1942 to promote patriotism and warn the public about domestic spying.

Spencer Tracy had been cast as the male lead in the film just days after MGM purchased the rights to the novel. George Cukor was chosen to direct in late April 1942 because he had dealt well with troubled and headstrong actors in the past, and Tracy was considered a difficult actor to direct. Bronisław Kaper, who had come to MGM in 1935 from Nazi Germany, was assigned to compose the film score. William H. Daniels was named the cinematographer.

Katharine Hepburn joined the cast in mid-April 1942 after Stewart sent her a copy of the unfinished script. Hepburn was fascinated by the character of Christine, and felt that doing the film would be a way of contributing to the war effort. MGM executives did not want Hepburn attached to the picture, feeling it was an inappropriate follow-up for her (first) previous pairing with Tracy in Woman of the Year (1942), but Hepburn insisted, and MGM relented. Hepburn showed some concerns with Stewart's redrafting of the script, in that he toned down the novel's love story, placing more emphasis on the character of O'Malley and the action. She asked for more romance in the film. Although Hepburn had spent much of the prior year searching for scripts with equally strong male and female parts for her and Tracy, she now requested that the O'Malley role be restored to the function it served in the novel (where O'Malley is impotent, troubled, and despairing of love) and her own part expanded. Film producer Victor Saville threatened to resign if the changes were made, and Spencer Tracy supported him, which led to the changes being rejected.

Nonetheless, the script still had numerous problems, and Stewart refused to recognize these shortcomings. In late summer 1942, Cukor brought in Zoë Akins, one of his favorite playwrights and screenwriters, to help with the script. Victor Saville expressed concern that Stewart was basing more and more of the script on William Randolph Hearst, one of Louis B. Mayer's best friends, and that this might jeopardize the success of the picture. As script work continued, casting on the film (which had been delayed months) went ahead in mid-1942. Richard Whorf was cast as the villain, Clive Kerndon, in early June. Frank Craven, Audrey Christie, Donald Meek and Stephen McNally were all cast in mid-July. Pauline Lord was cast in late July, and Darryl Hickman added in early August. Craven, whose character was not initially specified, was given the role of Dr. Fielding in early August. Forrest Tucker and Percy Kilbride were the last members of the cast hired. Phyllis Brooks tested for a part in the film in mid-June, but was not cast. A search was even made for the voice of Robert Forrest.

Principal filming and post-production
Principal filming began the last week of August 1942. The entire picture was filmed on a sound stage, with no location shooting. Hepburn had already begun her extramarital affair with Spencer Tracy, and the production was notorious for the ways in which Hepburn doted on Tracy. Tracy drank heavily during the shoot, and Hepburn was his constant guardian, nurse, maid, and gofer during this time. She tried to keep him out of the bars, assisted him when he was drunk, reinforced his ego, and ran lines with him. However, Hepburn continued to be upset by the script, and dealt with this problem by isolating herself from friends and family in order to concentrate on her interpretation of the role.
                                                                                                                                                     
The filming process was an efficient one, and it was going so well that in the middle of the production Cukor asked Hepburn to talk to Judy Garland in an attempt to convince Garland of the need to sober up. In order to add realism to the production, Cukor consulted reporters from United Press for advice on how newspapermen would handle Forrest's funeral. Based on their critiques, Cukor changed the scene in the village hotel's bar so that instead of drinking and talking about the funeral, the reporters get to work drafting articles on their typewriters. The script, too, was changed to permit the bartender to make a quip about reporters working rather than drinking.

Reshoots occurred in September and October. Katharine Hepburn returned to Hollywood in early September for retakes, and Pauline Lord was called back in early October. Although James E. Newcom was the film's editor, Cukor had final cut on the film. Lord's scenes were deleted from the picture, and her name did not appear on cast lists. She was replaced by Margaret Wycherley.

Release

The film was screened for the Office of War Information's Bureau of Motion Pictures on December 2, 1942. The Bureau's chief, Lowell Mellett, was unhappy with the picture and found it heavy-handed. MGM promoted Spencer Tracy for an Academy Award for Best Actor, but he was not nominated.

Keeper of the Flame premiered at the Albee Theatre in Cincinnati on January 28, 1943, setting a box-office record for the city. Following a few other limited dates in February, it had a premiere at New York City's Radio City Music Hall on Thursday, March 18, 1943.  The premiere served as a fundraiser for the Outdoor Cleanliness Association (a group dedicated to public lighting and enforcement of trash laws). The premiere did not go well: MGM head Louis B. Mayer stormed out, enraged by his having encouraged the making of a film that equated wealth with fascism. It opened in Los Angeles at Grauman's Chinese Theatre on Thursday, April 1, 1943. Keeper of the Flame made its Australian premiere at the Metro Theatre in Melbourne in June 1943. It didn't appear on American television until March 1957.

Box office
Although the film was held over for a fourth week at Radio City Music Hall (most films lasted a week), it did not do well at the box office nationally and is considered the least successful of the Hepburn-Tracy films. It earned $2,190,000 in the United States and Canada and $1,032,000 elsewhere, making an overall profit of $1,040,000.

Reception
The film generated some political controversy. Republican members of Congress complained about the film's obviously leftist politics and demanded that Will H. Hays, president of the Motion Picture Production Code, establish guidelines regarding propagandization for the motion picture industry.

Critical reaction at the time was mixed. While at least one reviewer felt the film was reminiscent of motion pictures like Citizen Kane and Rebecca, Hedda Hopper called it "Citizen Kane with all the art scraped off." Bosley Crowther, writing in The New York Times, concluded that while the first half of the film was very good, the latter half felt slow and failed to deliver emotional punch. Crowther called the film "a courageous and timely drama" and praised Tracy and Hepburn for performances that featured "taut solemnity." But the script seemed uneven dramatically ("... the nature of this story is a murder mystery and yet the interest is centered much more upon the dead man than on the hunt"), and a critical problem was that the audience "is informed much sooner than the journalist what the nature of Forrest was, and the story drags while we wait for the journalist to catch up." Crowther still enjoyed Cukor's direction, which he felt sustained mystery even when little existed.

Like Crowther, the Chicago Tribune and other critics pointed out that the picture seemed slow. The Hartford Courant, meanwhile, raved about the film: "Hepburn and Tracy have given us a great film in Keeper of the Flame ... Great because of the courage and daring it took to make it, the magnificent production it has been given, the excellent acting within it, and the exciting, tense story it contains." Generally speaking, the film was better received in the eastern half of the United States.

Cukor himself was highly dissatisfied by the film. "I suspect the story was basically fraudulent," he told an interviewer. Like many critics, he felt that "as a piece of storytelling, the unfolding of a mystery, the first half of Keeper of the Flame is a damn good show," but the rest of the film had substantial problems. He praised Spencer Tracy's work, saying: "Tracy ... was at his best in the picture. Subdued, cool, he conveyed the ruthlessness of the reporter sent to investigate Forrest's death without seeming to try. He was ideally cast in the role, grimly and skeptically exploring the secret of the dead boys' club hero who was in fact a rampant fascist." Hepburn, he felt, was hindered by the role and her approach to it. "It was Kate's last romantic glamour-girl part, and she acted with some of that artificiality she'd supposedly left behind at RKO. That first scene, floating into a room in yards and yards of draperies with these lillies—well, it was all far, far too much. I don't think I really believed in the story, it was pure hokeypokey, and her part was phony, highfalutin." But he felt Hepburn did her best: "That's awfully tricky, isn't it? And doesn't she give long, piercing looks at his portrait over the mantel? Well. I think she finally carried a slightly phony part because her humanity asserted itself, and her humor. They always did." Overall, though, Cukor felt the film was leaden, and that it had "a wax work quality". Even screenwriter Stewart eventually came to feel the film was "tedious, wooden, and heavy-handed".

More recently, some critics have reassessed the film positively, and it has been cited as 1943's "great emotional drama." Critics and scholars note that the film is a good example of the type of anti-fascist films produced in America early in World War II.

Kevin Starr states that the film "remains astonishing in its bold effort to shape American public opinion" and is a film that "preaches a hard-line Popular Front message." Robert Fyne, author of The Hollywood Propaganda of World War II, (1997) notes the film's "strong warning to the American people about demagoguery, domestic fascism, and mind control, while praising the virtues of freedom of the press."

One film historian has concluded that Keeper of the Flame is "truly provocative in that it was one of Hollywood's few forays into imagining the possibility of homegrown American Fascism and the crucial damage which can be done to individual rights when inhumane and tyrannical ideas sweep a society through a charismatic leader." Other authors have noted that the film is different from other anti-fascist films of the period in that it clearly links wealth and fascism and points out the ways in which patriotism may far too easily be turned toward fascist ends.

The technical quality of Keeper of the Flame has been highly praised since its release. William H. Daniels' cinematography and lighting design has been described as lush and virtuosic, and he received accolades from his peers for his work on the film. Cukor biographer and film critic Emanuel Levy praised the strong atmosphere of Keeper of the Flame and Cukor's "interesting Gothic style." Other historians have pointed out that the film's score is particularly good. For example, one review noted that the music goes silent during the climactic scene in which Christine Forrest reveals her secrets to Steven O'Malley—an effective and unexpected emotional tactic.

Notes

References

Bibliography

External links
 
 
 
 

 

1943 films
1943 drama films
American drama films
American black-and-white films
1940s English-language films
Films based on British novels
Films directed by George Cukor
Films set in country houses
Metro-Goldwyn-Mayer films
Films with screenplays by Donald Ogden Stewart
Films produced by Victor Saville
Films scored by Bronisław Kaper
Films based on works by I. A. R. Wylie
1940s American films